Yiddishism (Yiddish: ײִדישיזם) is a cultural and linguistic movement which began among Jews in Eastern Europe during the latter part of the 19th century. Some of the leading founders of this movement were Mendele Moykher-Sforim (1836–1917), I. L. Peretz (1852–1915), and Sholem Aleichem (1859–1916).

Origins
In 1861, Yehoshua Mordechai Lifshitz (1828–1878), who is considered the father of Yiddishism and Yiddish lexicography, circulated an essay entitled “The Four Classes” (Yiddish:  די פיר קלאַסן) in which he referred to Yiddish as a completely separate language from both German and Hebrew and, in the European context of his audience, the "mother tongue" of the Jewish people. In this essay, which was eventually published in 1863 in an early issue of the influential Yiddish periodical Kol Mevasser, he contended that the refinement and development of Yiddish were indispensable for the humanization and education of Jews. In a subsequent essay published in the same periodical, he also proposed Yiddish as a bridge linking Jewish and European cultures. Scholar Mordkhe Schaechter characterizes Lifshitz as "[t]he first conscious, goal-oriented language reformer" in the field of Yiddish, and highlights his pivotal role in countering the negative attitudes toward the language propagated within the Haskalah, or Jewish Enlightenment movement:

Although an adherent of the Enlightenment, [Lifshitz] broke with its sterile anti-Yiddish philosophy, to become an early ideologue of Yiddishism and of Yiddish-language planning. He courageously stood up for the denigrated folk tongue, calling for its elevation and cultivation. He did this in the form of articles in the weekly Kol-mevaser (in the 1860s) and in his excellent Russian-Yiddish and Yiddish-Russian dictionaries [...].

The Czernowitz Conference

From 30 August to 3 September 1908, "The Conference for the Yiddish Language" also known as "The Czernowitz Conference" took place in the Austro-Hungarian city of Czernowitz, Bukovina (today in southwestern Ukraine). The conference proclaimed Yiddish a modern language with a developing high culture. The organizers of this gathering (Benno Straucher, Nathan Birnbaum, Chaim Zhitlowsky, David Pinski, and Jacob Gordin) expressed a sense of urgency to the delegates that Yiddish as a language and as the binding glue of Jews throughout Eastern Europe needed help. They proclaimed that the status of Yiddish reflected the status of the Jewish people. Thus only by saving the language could the Jews as a people be saved from the onslaught of assimilation. The conference for the first time in history declared Yiddish to be "a national language of the Jewish people."

Further developments

In 1925 YIVO (Yiddish Scientific Institute; :  Yidisher Visnshaftlekher Institut) was established in Wilno, Poland (Vilnius, now part of Lithuania). YIVO was initially proposed by Yiddish linguist and writer Nochum Shtif (1879–1933). He characterized his advocacy of Yiddish as "realistic" Jewish nationalism, contrasted to the "visionary" Hebraists and the "self-hating" assimilationists who adopted Russian or Polish.

In the Soviet Union during the 1920s, Yiddish was promoted as the language of the Jewish proletariat. It became one of the official languages in the Ukrainian People's Republic and in some of the Soviet republics, such as the Belarusian Soviet Socialist Republic and the Galician Soviet Socialist Republic. A public educational system entirely based on the Yiddish language was established and comprised kindergartens, schools, and higher educational institutions. At the same time, Hebrew was considered a bourgeois language and its use was generally discouraged.

In 1928, the Soviet Union created the Jewish Autonomous Oblast. Located in the Russian Far East and bordering on China, its administrative center was the town of Birobidzhan. There, the Soviets envisaged setting up a new "Soviet Zion", where a proletarian Jewish culture could be developed. Yiddish, rather than Hebrew, would be the national language. Although the vast majority of the Yiddish-language cultural institutions in the Soviet Union were closed in the late 1930s, Yiddish continued to maintain a strong presence in some areas.

As many Eastern European Jews began to emigrate to the United States, the movement became very active there, especially in New York City. One aspect of this became known as Yiddish Theatre, and involved authors such as Ben Hecht and Clifford Odets. Another aspect was the huge Yiddish press, exemplified in the United States by Yiddish publications such as the Yiddish newspaper Forverts.

Owing in a large part to the efforts of the Yiddishist movement, Yiddish, before World War II, was becoming a major language, spoken by over 11,000,000 people.

The Holocaust, however, led to a dramatic, sudden decline in the use of Yiddish, as the extensive European Jewish communities, both secular and religious, that used Yiddish in their day-to-day life were largely destroyed. Around 5 million, or 85%, of the Jewish victims of the Holocaust, were speakers of Yiddish. This, coupled with the revival of the Hebrew language as the national language of Israel, essentially extinguished the dynamic momentum Yiddish had been gaining in the early decades of the 20th century.

See also
 Yiddish literature
 Yiddish symbols
 War of the Languages
 Jewish political movements
 California Institute for Yiddish Culture and Language
  — the first Yiddish grammar, published only partially. It proposed a romanized version based on the Białystok (Northeastern) dialect, as a unifying language for the Jews of the Russian Empire.

References

Sources
Joshua A. Fishman: Attracting a Following to High-Culture Functions for a Language of Everyday Life: The Role of the Tshernovits Language Conference in the ‘Rise of Yiddish,’ International Journal of the Sociology of Language 24, 1980, S. 43–73.
 Joshua A. Fishman: Ideology, Society and Language. The Odyssey of Nathan Birnbaum; Karoma Publ., Ann Arbor 1987, .
Joshua A. Fishman: The Tshernovits Conference Revisited: The ‘First World Conference for Yiddish’ 85 Years Later, in: The Earliest Stage of Language Planning, Berlin, 1993 S. 321–331.
 Emanuel S. Goldsmith: Modern Yiddish culture. The story of the Yiddish language movement. Fordham Univ Press, New York 1976, reprint 2000 .
 Herbert J. Lerner: The Tshernovits Language Conference. A Milestone in Jewish Nationalist Thought. New York NY 1957 (Masters Essay. Columbia University).

External links

 First Yiddish Language Conference, Czernowitz, August 30-September 3, 1908.

Yiddish
Yiddish culture
Literary movements
19th century in Europe
Jewish movements
19th-century Judaism
20th-century Judaism